Arndís Þórarinsdóttir (born 1982) is an Icelandic children's author.

Biography
Arndís studied at the Menntaskólinn í Reykjavík, took a BA in literature  at the University of Iceland, and an MA in creative writing at Goldsmiths, University of London. She took a further MA in creative writing at the University of Iceland in 2018, with a thesis entitled 'Vetur fram á vor: Skáldsaga fyrir börn' ('From Winter to Spring: A Novel for Children'). She is the head of the ancient and popular culture departments of the Kópavogur Public Library. She had joined the board of IBBY á Íslandi by 2008, and was its president around 2011.

In 2019, her novel Nærbuxnanjósnararnir was nominated for the Icelandic Literary Prize in the children's and young people's section, and in 2020 her Blokkin á heimsenda, co-written with Hulda Sigrún Bjarnadóttir, won the Barnabókaverðlaun Guðrúnar Helgadóttur. Arndís's 2022 novel Kollhnís was awarded the Icelandic Literary Prize.

Works

Writing
In addition to short stories for children and adults, Arndís has published:

 Játningar mjólkurfernuskálds (Reykjavík: Mál og menning, 2011)
 Lyginni líkast (Kópavogur: Námsgagnastofnun, 2013)
 Sitthvað á sveimi: lestrarbók (Kópavogur: Námsgagnastofnun, 2014)
 Gleraugun hans Góa (Kópavogur: Námsgagnastofnun, 2015)
 Nærbuxnaverksmiðjan (Reykjavík: Mál og menning, 2018), 
 Nærbuxnanjósnararnir (Reykjavík: Mál og menning, 2019)
 and Hulda Sigrún Bjarnadóttir, Blokkin á heimsenda (Reykjavík: Mál og menning, 2020)
 Bál tímans: Örlagasaga Möðruvallabókar í sjö hundruð ár (The Inferno of Time: The Adventures of a Vellum Manuscript over 700 Years) (Reykjavík: Forlagið, 2021). Illustrated by Sigmundur Breiðfjörð Þorgeirsson.
 Kollhnís (Somersault) (Reykjavík: Forlagið, 2022)

Translating
 Bjólfskviða: Forynjurnar og fræðimennirnir [translation of J. R. R. Tolkien 'Beowulf: The Monsters and the Critics'] (Reykjavík: Hið íslenzka bókmenntafélag, 2013)
 Rosie Banks's Secret Kingdom series of children's books (Reykjavík: JPV).

Editing
 Örþrasir: ljóðakver Listafélagsins, ed. by Arndís Þórarinsdóttir, Vésteinn Valgarðsson, and Haukur Þorgeirsson ([Reykjavík: Skólafélagið], [1999])

See also 

 List of Icelandic writers
 Icelandic literature

External links
 Personal website
 Interview in Morgunblaðið, 24 October 2011

References

Arndis Thorarinsdottir
Living people
Arndis Thorarinsdottir
1982 births
Arndis Thorarinsdottir
Arndis Thorarinsdottir
Arndis Thorarinsdottir
Arndis Thorarinsdottir
Alumni of Goldsmiths, University of London